Valencinia is a genus of worms belonging to the family Valenciniidae.

The species of this genus are found in United Kingdom.

Species:

Valencinia blanca 
Valencinia dubia 
Valencinia lineformis 
Valencinia longirostris

References

Nemerteans